José Emilio Guerra Rodríguez (born 15 March 1982) is a Spanish professional footballer who plays as a forward.

Club career
Guerra was born in Vélez-Málaga, Andalusia. He played ten Segunda División matches with CD Castellón, for which he signed in February 2010 at nearly 28 years of age, but spent the vast majority of his career in the lower leagues of his country.  

Guerra's twin brother, Javier, was also a footballer and a forward, and represented mainly Real Valladolid and Rayo Vallecano.

References

External links

1982 births
Living people
People from Vélez-Málaga
Spanish twins
Twin sportspeople
Sportspeople from the Province of Málaga
Spanish footballers
Footballers from Andalusia
Association football forwards
Segunda División players
Segunda División B players
Tercera División players
Divisiones Regionales de Fútbol players
RCD Espanyol B footballers
UE Vilassar de Mar players
UE Figueres footballers
CF Reus Deportiu players
Palamós CF footballers
CE Sabadell FC footballers
Real Zaragoza B players
FC Barcelona Atlètic players
Atlético Madrid B players
CD Castellón footballers
Benidorm CF footballers
CD Puertollano footballers
Atlético Malagueño players
Kavala F.C. players
Liga II players
AFC Săgeata Năvodari players
LPS HD Clinceni players
Spanish expatriate footballers
Expatriate footballers in Greece
Expatriate footballers in Romania
Spanish expatriate sportspeople in Greece
Spanish expatriate sportspeople in Romania